KieranTimberlake is an American architecture firm founded by Stephen Kieran and James Timberlake in Philadelphia. The firm espouses a philosophy of sustainable design, collaborative design, and in-depth research. They have also shown an interest in prefabrication, new technologies and integrating architecture with the actual activities to take place in the buildings they design, especially using "teaching" design elements in schools. Their interest in productions and craft led them to team up with DuPont to develop Smartwrap, a laminated polymer film that can support thin interstitial films, including photovoltaics, OLEDs, polarizing or UV screens, etc.

History
James Timberlake and Stephen Kieran met at the University of Pennsylvania School of Architecture, joining Venturi, Scott Brown, and Associates, before receiving Rome Prizes separately and finally founding their practice in 1984. The firm maintained itself as a noted sustainable design firm for many years, building a reputation for attention to detail and consistency. The partners were awarded the inaugural Latrobe Fellowship from the American Institute of Architects in 2001.

KieranTimberlake received more attention after the publication of Refabricating Architecture, a book that explains and argues for the prefabrication of buildings using Building Information Modeling and close coordination of architects and contractors. Timberlake and Kieran argue that offsite production of buildings would be less expensive, more sustainable, and offer tolerances and techniques not possible in on-site construction. They also insist that mass-customization, as they call it, is the proper extension of the ideas expressed by Le Corbusier and other early modernists, who sought to develop inexpensive and easily built housing. Consequently, the book emulates the format and style of Toward an Architecture.

Work

Atwater Commons, Middlebury College, Middlebury, Vermont
Berkeley College, Yale University, New Haven, Connecticut
Brockman Hall for Physics, Rice University, Houston
Cellophane House, for MoMA's Exhibit Home Delivery, Fabricating the Modern Dwelling New York City
Center City Building, University of North Carolina at Charlotte, Charlotte, North Carolina
 Engineering Research Center, Brown University, 2017
New Embassy of the United States, London
LivingHomes, Single and Multi-Family Off-site Fabricated Housing (LEED Platinum Certified)
Loblolly House, Taylors Island, Maryland
Stewart Middle School, Sidwell Friends, Washington, D.C. (LEED Platinum Certified)
Melvin J. and Claire Levine Hall, University of Pennsylvania, Philadelphia
Noyes Community Center, Cornell University, 2006
Northwest Campus Infill Housing, University of California, Los Angeles
Pendleton West, Wellesley College, Wellesley, Massachusetts
Pierson and Davenport College, Yale University, New Haven, Connecticut
Sculpture Building and School of Art Gallery, Yale University, New Haven, Connecticut (LEED Platinum Certified)
Silliman College, Yale University, New Haven, Connecticut
SmartWrap Pavilion, Cooper Hewitt National Design Museum, New York City
Special NO 9 House, Make It Right Foundation, New Orleans (LEED Platinum Certified)
West Campus Residential Initiative, Cornell University, Ithaca, New York

Awards
Rice University Physics Lab, Institute Honor Awards Recognize Excellence in Architecture, American Institute of Architects, 2015
The Quaker Meeting House and Arts Center at Sidwell Friends School in Washington, DC, Institute Honor Awards in Architecture, American Institute of Architects, 2014
Morse and Ezra Stiles Colleges, Yale University, Institute Honor Awards Recognize Excellence in Architecture, American Institute of Architects, 2013
Cooper-Hewitt National Design Award for Architecture 2010
AIA Architecture Firm Award, 2008.
Special NO 9 House, Make It Right Foundation, Top Ten Green Award, Committee on the Environment (COTE), American Institute of Architects, 2010
West Campus Residential Initiative, Cornell University, Citation, Committee on Architecture for Education, American Institute of Architects, 2009
Sculpture Building and School of Art Gallery, Yale University, Award for Excellence, Committee on Architecture for Education, American Institute of Architects, 2009
Yale University Sculpture Building and Gallery, Top Ten Green Award, Committee on the Environment (COTE), American Institute of Architects, 2008
Loblolly House, Institute Honor Award for Architecture, American Institute of Architects, 2008
Sidwell Friends School, Award for Excellence, Committee on Architecture for Education, American Institute of Architects, 2007
Sidwell Friends Middle School, Top Ten Green Award, Committee on the Environment (COTE), American Institute of Architects, 2007
Yale University, Pierson and Davenport College, Institute Honor Award for Interior Architecture, American Institute of Architects, 2007

Notes

External links
official site*

Architecture firms based in Pennsylvania
Companies established in 1984
Companies based in Philadelphia